Santiago (also North Star) is an unincorporated community in North Fayette Township, Allegheny County, Pennsylvania, United States.

Notes

Unincorporated communities in Allegheny County, Pennsylvania
Unincorporated communities in Pennsylvania